KWW may refer to:
 The Kohlrausch-Williams-Watts function is the Fourier transform of the stretched exponential function
 Katosi Water Works, water treatment facility in Uganda
 Krekel van der Woerd Wouterse, Dutch management consultants from 1960 to 1996